Grand-Champ is a commune in the Morbihan department of Brittany in north-western France.

Demographics
Inhabitants of Grand-Champ are called Grégamistes in French. Grand-Champ counted 5,404 inhabitants in 2017, an increase of 14% compared to 2007.

Geography 
The town is situated 15 kilometres northwest of Vannes.

Breton language
In 2008 7.77% of children attended bilingual schools in primary education.

History 
There are many references to Roi Stevan, that's why the motto of this town is : Grand-Champ, King Stevan Home.

 Bataille de Grand-Champ in 1795, during chouannerie repression.
 On 1 December 1870, the Balloon mail Bataille-de-Paris, created by Jules Antoine Lissajous starts from Gare du Nord in Paris, at this time besieged by Prussians, and ends 460 kilometers away in Grand-Champ.

Places and monuments 

 Saint Tugdual church (1866-1977). This church has, in its nave, two wooden-made panels coming from Notre-dame of Burgo Chapel.
 Chapel Notre-Dame-du-Perpétuel-Secours (1898).
 Chapelle Sainte-Brigitte à Loperhet (1560-1588).
 Chapel of Lopabu (around 1520).
 Chapelle Notre-Dame au Burgo (1520-1540) - historical monument.
 Chapel Notre-Dame-des-Fleurs au Moustoir des Fleurs (beginning of 15th century).
 Fountain de Loperhet (end of 16th century).
 Fountain de Burgo (1573) - historical monument.
 Calvary of Lopabu (1520).
 Moustoir des Fleurs calvary (16th century).
 Croix au centre du cimetière.
 Castle of Penhoët (1756) known simply as « Grand-Champ », owned by the Prince Obolensky, Arnaud Henry Salas-Perez.
 Castle of Rest (15th century).
 Manor de Kermainguy (15th century).
 Manor de Kerleguen (1427).
 Well of Locmeren-des-Prés.

See also
Communes of the Morbihan department

References

External links

Official site 

 Mayors of Morbihan Association 

Communes of Morbihan